Mimeresia issia, the Stempffer's harlequin, is a butterfly in the family Lycaenidae. It is found in central and eastern Ivory Coast and Ghana. The habitat consists of wetter forests.

References

Butterflies described in 1969
Poritiinae